The following highways are numbered 163:

Brazil
 BR-163

Canada
 Prince Edward Island Route 163

Costa Rica
 National Route 163

India
 National Highway 163 (India)

Japan
 Japan National Route 163

United States
 U.S. Route 163 (former)
 U.S. Route 163
 Alabama State Route 163
 Arkansas Highway 163
 Arkansas Highway 163 Spur
 Arkansas State Road 163 (former)
 California State Route 163
 Connecticut Route 163
 Florida State Road 163
 Georgia State Route 163 (former)
 Illinois Route 163
 Indiana State Road 163
 Iowa Highway 163
 K-163 (Kansas highway)
 Kentucky Route 163
 Louisiana Highway 163
 Maine State Route 163
 Missouri Route 163
 Nevada State Route 163
 New Jersey Route 163
 New Mexico State Road 163
 New York State Route 163
 North Carolina Highway 163
 Ohio State Route 163
 Pennsylvania Route 163
 Tennessee State Route 163
 Texas State Highway 163
 Texas State Highway Loop 163
 Utah State Route 163 (former)
 Virginia State Route 163
 Washington State Route 163
 Wisconsin Highway 163 (former)
Territories:
 Puerto Rico Highway 163